George P. Hoffman House is a historic home located at Blythewood, Richland County, South Carolina. It was built about 1855, and is a one-story, braced-frame Greek Revival style residence. The house consists of a central, five-bay block, flanked by three-bay wings.  It features a pedimented porch that spans the three central bays of the façade.
Today it serves as the Town Hall for Blythewood.
It was added to the National Register of Historic Places in 1986.

References

Houses on the National Register of Historic Places in South Carolina
Greek Revival houses in South Carolina
Houses completed in 1855
Houses in Richland County, South Carolina
National Register of Historic Places in Richland County, South Carolina